Sheung Tak Estate is a public housing estate in Tseung Kwan O, New Territories, Hong Kong, near Hong Kong Velodrome and Haven of Hope Hospital. It is the sixth public housing estate in Tseung Kwan O and comprises 9 blocks of Harmony I and Small Household Block styles built in 1998 and 2002 respectively.

Kwong Ming Court, Po Ming Court and Tong Ming Court are Home Ownership Scheme housing courts in Tseung Kwan O near Sheung Tak Estate, built between 1998 and 1999.

Houses

Sheung Tak Estate

Kwong Ming Court

Po Ming Court

Tong Ming Court

Demographics
According to the 2016 by-census, Sheung Tak Estate had a population of 18,750, Kwong Ming Court had a population of 12,665, Po Ming Court had a population of 4,370 while Tong Ming Court had a population of 5,904. Altogether the population amounts to 41,689.

Politics
For the 2019 District Council election, the estate fell within three constituencies. Sheung Tak Estate is located in the Sheung Tak constituency, which is represented by Lee Ka-yui, Kwong Ming Court and Po Ming Court are located in the Kwong Ming constituency, which is represented by Ricky Or Yiu-lam, while Tong Ming Court falls within the O Tong constituency, which was formerly represented by Lui Man-kwong until July 2021.

See also

Public housing estates in Tseung Kwan O

References

Residential buildings completed in 1998
Residential buildings completed in 2003
Tseung Kwan O
Public housing estates in Hong Kong